The Brazeau Formation is a geologic formation in Alberta. It preserves fossils dating back to the Cretaceous period.

See also

 List of fossiliferous stratigraphic units in Alberta

References
 

Cretaceous Alberta
Western Canadian Sedimentary Basin